A bill of rights, sometimes called a declaration of rights or a charter of rights, is a list of the most important rights to the citizens of a country.  The purpose is to protect those rights against infringement from public officials and private citizens.

Bills of rights may be entrenched or unentrenched. An entrenched bill of rights cannot be amended or repealed by a country's legislature through regular procedure, instead requiring a supermajority or referendum; often it is part of a country's constitution, and therefore subject to special procedures applicable to constitutional amendments.

History

The history of legal charters asserting certain  rights for particular groups goes back to the Middle Ages and earlier. An example is the Magna Carta, an English legal charter agreed between the King and his barons in 1215. In the early modern period, there was renewed interest in the Magna Carta. English common law judge Sir Edward Coke revived the idea of rights based on citizenship by arguing that Englishmen had historically enjoyed such rights. The Petition of Right 1628, the Habeas Corpus Act 1679 and the Bill of Rights 1689 (English Bill of Rights) established certain rights in statute.

In the Thirteen Colonies, the English Bill of Rights was one of the influences on the 1776 Virginia Declaration of Rights, which in turn influenced the United States Declaration of Independence later that year. After the Constitution of the United States was adopted in 1789, the United States Bill of Rights was ratified in 1791. The U.S. Constitution and Bill of Rights were influenced by British constitutional history.

Inspired by the Age of Enlightenment, the Declaration of the Rights of Man and of the Citizen asserted the universality of rights. It was adopted in 1789 by France's National Constituent Assembly, during the period of the French Revolution.

The 20th century saw different groups draw on these earlier documents for influence when drafting the Universal Declaration of Human Rights, the European Convention on Human Rights and the United Nations Convention on the Rights of the Child.

Exceptions in Western democracies
The constitution of the United Kingdom remains uncodified. However, the Bill of Rights of 1689 is part of UK law. The Human Rights Act 1998 also incorporates the rights contained in the European Convention on Human Rights into UK law. Recent infringements of liberty, democracy and the rule of law have led to demands for a new comprehensive British Bill of Rights upheld by a new independent Supreme Court with the power to nullify government laws and policies violating its terms.

Australia is the only common law country with neither a constitutional nor federal legislative bill of rights to protect its citizens, although there is ongoing debate in many of Australia's states. In 1973, Federal Attorney-General Lionel Murphy introduced a human rights Bill into parliament, although it was never passed. In 1984, Senator Gareth Evans drafted a Bill of Rights, but it was never introduced into parliament, and in 1985, Senator Lionel Bowen introduced a bill of rights, which was passed by the House of Representatives, but failed to pass the Senate. Former Australian Prime Minister John Howard has argued against a bill of rights for Australia on the grounds it would transfer power from elected politicians to unelected judges and bureaucrats. Victoria, Queensland and the Australian Capital Territory (ACT) are the only states and territories to have a human rights Act. However, the principle of legality present in the Australian judicial system, seeks to ensure that legislation is interpreted so as not to interfere with basic human rights, unless legislation expressly intends to interfere.

List of bills of rights

General

Specifically targeted documents
 Consumer Bill of Rights
 Homeless Bill of Rights
 Taxpayer Bill of Rights
 Academic Bill of Rights 
 Veterans' Bill of Rights
 G.I. Bill of Rights, better known as the G.I. Bill
 Homosexual Bill of Rights, drafted by North American Conference of Homophile Organizations
 Library Bill of Rights, published by the American Library Association
 Environmental Bill of Rights or Agenda 21
 Creator's Bill of Rights, comic writers and artists
 Donor's Bill of Rights, for philanthropic donors
 Law Enforcement Officers' Bill of Rights
 California Voter Bill of Rights, adaptation of the Voting Rights Act
 Islamic Bill of Rights for Women in the Mosque
 New Jersey Anti-Bullying Bill of Rights Act
 Credit Cardholders' Bill of Rights, contained within the Credit CARD Act of 2009
 Sexual Assault Survivors' Bill of Rights (Sexual Assault Survivors' Rights Act)

See also
Bill of Rights Bill
Inalienable rights
International Bill of Human Rights
International human rights instruments 
Natural rights
Rule of law
Second Bill of Rights

References

Constitutional law
Rights
National human rights instruments